Fierro, originally Fierro a Fierro, was an Argentinian comics magazine, with two very different runs:

First run (1984–1992) 
The first incarnation of Fierro was edited by Ediciones de la Urraca between September 1984 and December 1992, which ran for 100 issues, two anthology books and special editions on Argentine comics authors, as well as supplements in some numbers.

Denomination 
The title Fierro comes from a series of connotations that remit to the Argentinian ideal of prowess and adventure. The complete name of the magazine, Fierro a fierro was taken of an old Gaucho cartoon by Raúl Roux published in the magazine Patoruzito. The word remits equally to several things: it is the old Spanish "form" of hierro  (iron), and therefore it does reference to the metal like the leading magazines in the genre in that period, Métal Hurlant and Heavy Metal. It also evokes Martín Fierro, José Hernández poem.

It carried the subtitle Historietas para sobrevivientes (Comics for survivors).

Path 
The aim of the magazine was to gather the best of the Argentine and international production, in addition to giving space to new authors.

The cover of the first number was drawn by Oscar Chichoni, who made covers of the magazine in numerous opportunities. It covers it is presented a conjunction of eroticism and technology, body and machine. In the inner pages were publishes the following stories:

In 1984 the magazine carried out a contest designated Fierro busca a dos manos. The winner in the category of drawing was 15 years old artist from Rosario that signed as Max Cachimba and in the category writing won Pablo DeSantis. Both continued publishing in the magazine, first in group, with drawings of Cachimba done De Santis scripts and afterwards Max Cachimba began to do his own scripts, whereas Pablo DeSantis worked with other cartoonists.

In 1985 Fierro began to include the supplement Óxido. This same year it won the prize to the best comic magazine in the 5º Barcelona International Comics Convention.

In July 1988, after publishing the issue 47 Juan Sasturain left the job of publisher by internal reasons. He was replaced by the screenwriter and writer Pablo de Santis and Juan Manuel Lima as art director.

Fierro was cancelled in the 100th issue, in December 1992. After the cancellation two books with new material and complete cartoons were published, in August and December 1993.

Legacy 
In the words of Andrés Ferreiro and Hernán Ostuni, Fierro, in his first period, constituted a true cultural Molotov cocktail.

An important quantity of originals of this first stage were exhibited, between January and August 2008, in shows it Homage to the Argentinian Cartoon, made in the National Centre of the Image, Angoulême, France, by initiative of José Muñoz.

Second run (2006-2017) 
After almost fifteen years of absence, Fierro was relaunched in October 2006 as an optional supplement of the newspaper Pagina/12. Directed by Juan Sasturain, who was director of the magazine in his first period until the number 47, and by Lautaro Ortiz as publisher, hits comeback was preceded by the promotion of the magazine to charge of Sasturain and some of his collaborators in the Argentinian television and of adverts in Pagina /12.

The first number, with cover by José Muñoz, sold out in less than five days, being necessary a second printing.  The new subhead of the series reaffirms said feeling of identity: "The Argentinian comic". The inclusion of foreign material is infrequent, unlike his first version.

In his first number the team of artists was composed in his majority by part of the team who worked in Fierro's first run. The following numbers incorporated new artists, such as Juan Sáenz Valiente, Pablo Tunic, Lucas Varela, Ignacio Minaverry, Lucas Nine, Gustavo Sala, Diego Agrimbau, Salvador Sanz, Alejandra Lunik, Ariel López V., Polaco Scalerandi, Semola Souto, among others.

In 2007 it incorporated the supplement Picado fino, that looks for to give space to unpublished artists and a greater experimentation, emulating in some form the Subtemento Oxido of the first Fierro. Also it publishes periodically the supplement Picado grueso, that presents works of artists already consecrated, as Enrique Breccia or El Marino Turco

In 2012, Fierro was also published in Brazil by Zarabatana Books. It is a compilation of stories published in Argentina, beside comics by Brazilian cartoonists.

The last number of Fierro was published in March 2017.

References

Bibliography

External links 
  Revista Fierro official blog
 Homenaje a la Historieta Argentina en Francia 2008
 Ficha de Revista Fierro Historieteca

Spanish-language magazines
Comics magazines published in Argentina